Rick Garcia is a news anchor most recently of CBS News Los Angeles. He worked for 22 years at KTTV-TV and KCOP-TV in Los Angeles, California and was the host of KTTV's NFL post-game show “Fox Overtime,” and KTTV's Major League Baseball post-game show, “Extra Inning.” Garcia joined KCAL-TV and KCBS-TV as a news anchor in 2009.  While he was the co-anchor of KCAL news, the station became the most-watched prime-time newscast in Southern California during the 2010–11 season.

He received several Emmy Awards, the NATPE’s Iris Award, the National Hispanic Media Coalition’s Excellence in Broadcast Journalism award, and the Golden Mikes Award.

Rick Garcia also acted in many TV shows as a news anchor, including 24, Buffy the Vampire Slayer, LA Law, and The X-Files. He also acted in movies, including Collateral Damage and The American President.

References

American television news anchors
Emmy Award winners
Year of birth missing (living people)
Living people